Sheryl Davis Kohl (born January 3, 1962) is an American politician who represented District 34A in the Maryland House of Delegates.

Background
Born in Baltimore, Maryland on January 3, 1962, Kohl was appointed by Republican Governor Robert Ehrlich to the Maryland House of Delegates in July 2005 to replace Charles R. Boutin, who resigned when he was appointed by Ehrlich to become a member of the Maryland Public Service Commission.

Education
Kohl attended Youth's Benefit Elementary School in Fallston, MD before attending Fallston High School. She later graduated from Albright College with a Bachelor of Arts in political science in 1984. In 1986, she earned a Master of Public Administration from the University of Baltimore.

In the legislature
While a member of the Maryland House of Delegates, Kohl was a member of the Health and Government Operations Committee, the Women Legislators of Maryland, and the Maryland Veterans Caucus.

Kohl was defeated in her first election by Democrats Mary-Dulany James and B. Daniel Riley. Delegate Riley was the delegate prior to Boutin when District 36 was represented by 3 delegates. In 2002, the districts were redrawn and Riley lost to Boutin in a 2 delegate District 34A.

In 2010, Kohl attempted to re-enter elected office by running for a seat on the Harford County Council. She lost to incumbent Councilwoman Mary Ann Lisanti.

Kohl is now the owner of a temporary business staffing services company, Beacon Staffing  and was recently appointed to a commission to study government operation and spending by Harford County Executive David R. Craig.

Election results
2006 Race for Maryland House of Delegates – District 34A - Cecil & Harford County
Voters to choose two:
{| class="wikitable"
!Name
!Votes
!Percent
!Outcome
|-
|-
|Mary-Dulany James, Dem.
|12,697
|  31.7%
|   Won
|-
|- 
|B. Daniel Riley, Dem.
|10,969
|  27.3%
|   Won
|-
|- 
|Glen Glass, Rep.
|8,554
|  21.0%
|   Lost
|-
|- 
|Sheryl Davis Kohl, Rep.
|8,085
|  19.9%
|   Lost
|-
|Write-Ins
|22
|  0.1%
|   Lost
|}

References and notes

External links
 Maryland Archives

Living people
1962 births
Politicians from Baltimore
People from Fallston, Maryland
Albright College alumni
University of Baltimore alumni
Members of the Maryland House of Delegates
Women state legislators in Maryland
21st-century American women